Kaplong Hydroelectric Project (Kalpong Dam) is the largest dam of the Andaman & Nicobar Islands. Built across the Kalpong River at Nabagram Diglipur in the North and Middle Andaman district the dam was completed in 2001 and commissioned on 1 September 2001 by Shri M. Kannappan the Minister of State for Non-Conventional Energy Sources. The dam was executed by NHPC and run by Electricity Department of Andaman & Nicobar Administration was commissioned 15 months ahead of schedule.

It is a Rock-Fill and Concrete Gravity dam with an storage capacity of 15,270,000 m3 (12,380 acre·ft) and having a reservoir area of 1,.84 Km2 (455 acres). The length of Concrete dam on left fork is 138 m (452.7 ft) and the height is 34 m (103 ft) while length of Rockfill Dam on right fork is 146 m (479 ft) and the height is 27 m (88.5 ft).

Kalpong Hydroelectric Project has an installed capacity of 5.25 MW of electricity. It is the only hydro-electric project in the Andaman and Nicobar Islands. The project is expected to generate 14.83 million units of electricity annually for the people of Andaman and Nicobar Islands notably for the residence of Diglipur and its nearby towns. The production cost of electricity from the Kalpong project is merely Rs. 1.89 per unit at the time of commissioning.

Technical Features

Gallery

See also
List of dams and reservoirs in Andaman and Nicobar Islands
Kalpong River

References

Buildings and structures in the Andaman and Nicobar Islands
Gravity dams
Dams completed in 2001
Hydroelectric power stations in India
North and Middle Andaman district